Gajanayake Arachchige Madhumadhawa Aravinda Siriwardana,, better known as Madhumadhawa Aravinda, is a Sri Lankan singer, actor, journalist and a politician. He is also a past president of the Sri Lankan Singers Association.

Personal life
Coming from a family of artists, Aravinda's father Sunil Siriwardana is a musician in Sri Lanka. His mother Susiri Siriwardena also a lyricist. His younger brother Dananjaya Siriwardana is also a popular actor in television and cinema. He was married to popular actress Nilmini Tennakoon, and they have one daughter Shvetha Mandakini Siriwardana. He met Nilmini during the teledrama Pini Bindu in 1992. They got married on 5 May 1996. They divorced in the early 2000s.

In 2011, Aravinda married a Muslim woman named Renusha. The wedding was celebrated on 14 February 2011 Pegasas Reef Hotel, Wattala. They divorced in late 2015 due to racial differences as said by him. In March 2019, he married Niluka Boteju, which is Aravinda's third marriage.

Aravinda's grandfather, Peter Siriwardena was an accomplished musician and an actor. He worked as a lecturer in music at the Government Women's Training College, Polgolla. Aravinda's grandmother Srimathi Karuna Devi was a music teacher as well as an actress.

Aravinda's aunt Chandrika Siriwardena is also a popular songstress and playback singer. She was married to Anton Alwis, who was a journalist as well as a lyricist. Anton died on 26 March 2018 at the age of 64. Chandrika's granddaughter Dulshara Dasanthi is also a singer.

Politics
He is an active member of Pivithuru Helu Urumaya and served as a party councillor. He was elected to the Colombo Municipal Council and also contested the Western Provincial Council election under the United People's Freedom Alliance ticket, but failed to secure a seat. He is currently serving as one of chief organisers in the Colombo district.

In July 2014 the CID recorded a statement from Aravinda and questioned him over the unrest occurred in Aluthgama and Beruwala on 15 June.

In November 2019, Aravinda was filmed making a speech where he urged voters to support the SLPP candidate Gotabhaya Rajapaksa in the 2019 Sri Lankan presidential election if they wanted to stop Islamism from spreading.

Discography
Aravinda commenced his singing career in 1990 along with his friend, Namal Udugama. He sang his first song in 1990 and the producer of that program was his father Sunil Siriwardana. Although he only recorded few handful of songs, when compared with his fellow musicians, songs such as Lamba Sawan and Sith Sith gain enormous popularity.

Television
Aravinda, along with Suranga Lakmal Senevirathne had produced the television show, Kiyum Kerum, which was based on expressions, idioms, proverbs, imagery in Sinhala. He performed in season one of Sirasa Dancing Stars and Derana Star City. He also participated in Sirasa Superstar generation 4 as a judge.

Single song tracks released

Filmography
Aravinda acted few films in his career, though they are more notable. He played supporting roles in Siri Daladagamanaya and Aba.

 No. denotes the position of the film in the list of Sri Lankan movies in chronological order.

References

External links
 
2016.09.10 – Danna Kenek “දන්න කෙනෙක්” Interview with Madumadawa Aravinda
 මධුමාධව අරවින්ද පිළිතුරු දෙයි
 අරවින්ද යායක මධුමාධව
 මධුමාධව අරවින්ද කියන සුන්දර කතාව

Living people
20th-century Sri Lankan male singers
Sinhalese singers
Sri Lankan male film actors
1973 births
Sinhalese male actors